The Sella Formation is a Dapingian to Darriwilian geologic formation of southern Bolivia. The grey to green bioturbated siltstones interbedded with thin sandstone layers bear lenticular shell beds. Other parts of the formation contain yellow-green limy shales and grey sandy limestones. Coquinas often fill gutter casts and included brachiopods, trilobites, bivalves and nautiloids. The sediments were deposited in an open marine environment. The species Coxiconchia sellaensis was named after the formation.

Fossil content 
The formation has provided the following fossils:

 Baltograptus minutus
 Coxiconchia sellaensis
 Desmorthis segnis
 Glyptorthis imbrex
 Hemiprionodonta lusitanica
 Lingulocystis boliviensis
 Natasia boliviensis
 Pliomeridius sulcatus
 Redonia riojana
 Ribeiria spinosa
 Peelerophon cf. oehlerti
 Ampyx sp.
 Boeckaspis sp.
 Branisaspis sp.
 Bucania sp.
 Colpocoryphe sp.
 Cosmogoniophorina sp.
 Ctenodonta sp.
 Cyptendoceras sp.
 Didymograptus sp.
 Endoceras sp.
 Eothinoceras sp.
 Famatinolithus sp.
 Haploprimitia sp.
 Hoekaspis sp.
 Lecanospira sp.
 Lonchodomas sp.
 Maclurites sp.
 Quadrilobella sp.
 Parapyxion sp.
 Protocycloceras sp.
 Sibiritella sp.
 Suriaspis sp.
 Synhomalonotus sp.
 Technophorus sp.
 Trinucleus sp.

See also 
 List of fossiliferous stratigraphic units in Bolivia

References

Bibliography

Further reading 
 C. Babin and L. Branisa. 1987. Ribeiria, Peelrophon y otros molluscos del Ordovícico de Bolivia. 4˚ Congreso Latinoamericano de Paleontología 1:119-129
 L. Branisa. 1965. Los fosiles guias de Bolivia: I. Paleozoico. Boletin de Servicio Geologico de Bolivia. La Paz, Bolivia 6:1-282
 V. Havlicek and L. Branisa. 1980. Ordovician brachiopods of Bolivia: Succession of assemblages, climate control, affinity to Anglo-French and Bohemian provinces. Rozpravy Ceskoslovenske Akademie Ved. Rada Matematickych a Prirodnich Ved. Academia Praha, Prague, Czechoslovakia 90(1):1-54
 T. M. Sánchez and C. Babin. 2005. Lower Ordovician bivalves from southern Bolivia: paleobiogeographic affinities. Ameghiniana 42(3):559-566
 R. Suárez Soruco. 1976. El sistema ordovícico en Bolivia. Revista Tecnica YPF Bolivia 5(2):111-123

Geologic formations of Bolivia
Ordovician System of South America
Ordovician Bolivia
Dapingian
Darriwilian
Siltstone formations
Sandstone formations
Open marine deposits
Ordovician southern paleotemperate deposits
Paleontology in Bolivia
Formations